DeLille Cellars is a winery in Woodinville, Washington, USA. The tasting room is located in the Hollywood District of Woodinville, at the former Redhook Brewery. DeLille Cellars specializes in wines using the Bordeaux grape varieties: Cabernet Sauvignon, Merlot, Cabernet Franc, and Petit Verdot. In 2000, DeLille won The New York Times Wine Today.com "Winery of the Year" award. It is one of Washington state's premier cult wines.

DeLille Cellars is in the "Top 100" Guides of Wine Spectator and Wine Enthusiast for both red and white wine (D2, Signature Syrah, Chaleur Blanc), as well as being honored as Wine Enthusiast Wine Star  - Top Five American Wineries. DeLille Cellars was one of the first five wineries in Washington State to receive Robert Parker’s 5-star/Outstanding rating. DeLille Cellars was recently named a Top 100 Winery in the World for two consecutive years (2017, 2018 ) by Wine and Spirits Magazine .

In 2018, DeLille Cellars achieved the highest ever unmatched auction lot bid in the history of the Auction of Washington Wines.

History 
The winery was founded in 1992 by Jay Soloff, winemaker Chris Upchurch, and Charles and Greg Lill. For the few first years, Master of wine David Lake served as consulting enologist.

In March 2019, DeLille Cellars moved all production and offices to the old Redhook Brewery site in Woodinville, with a new tasting room set to open in Fall 2019.

Winemaking 
Founding Winemaker and Founding Partner Chris Upchurch has led the winery with a passion for traditional winemaking methods that showcase the terroir of the state. Guiding the winery's operations, Director of Winemaking Jason Gorski has been key to the winery's growth and continued lineup of accolades since 2011.

Wines 
DeLille Cellars has a portfolio of over a dozen Bordeaux and Rhône style blends true to the terroir of Washington State.

Grand Ciel Cabernet Sauvignon, Chaleur Estate, D2, Harrison Hill, Four Flags Cabernet Sauvignon and Chaleur Blanc are the Bordeaux style labels. Rhone-style blends include Signature Syrah, Rhône-styled Syrah, produced from grapes grown in Boushey Vineyard, Métier (a Châteauneuf-du-Pape style red, and Doyenne (a Syrah and Cabernet Sauvignon blend. DeLille Cellars also makes a Roussanne and a traditional Rosé.

The winery sources its grapes primarily in the Red Mountain AVA in Eastern Washington and utilizes 100% French oak barrels. The winery has an estate vineyard on Red Mountain, Grand Ciel Vineyard.

At the 2001 San Francisco International Wine Competition, DeLille Cellars won "Best in Show" in the Premium red blend category for its 1998 Yakima Valley D2.

See also 
 Woodinville wine country

References

External links 
 DeLille Cellars Official Page

Wineries in Washington (state)